William Wilson was a Republican member of the United States House of Representatives who served Pennsylvania's 9th congressional district from March 1815 to March 1819.

Despite his four years in office, in the Fourteenth and Fifteenth Congresses, remarkably little, if any, historical documentation survives regarding William Wilson's life, including the years of his birth and death.

External links

The Political Graveyard

18th-century births
19th-century deaths
Year of birth unknown
Place of birth unknown
Year of death unknown
Place of death unknown
Democratic-Republican Party members of the United States House of Representatives from Pennsylvania